Richard Leigh may refer to:
Richard Leigh (martyr) (c. 1561–1588), Catholic martyr
Richard Leigh (officer of arms), Clarenceux King of Arms, died 1597 
Richard Leigh (poet) (1649/50–1728), English poet
Richard Leigh (footballer) (born 1974), Australian rules footballer
Richard Leigh (author) (1943–2007), co-author of The Holy Blood and the Holy Grail
Richard Leigh (songwriter) (born 1951), American country music songwriter
Richard Leigh (musician), free-improvising musician, member of the Musics collective
Richard H. Leigh, U.S. Navy admiral
Richard Leigh (cricketer) (1784–1841), English cricketer
Richard Leigh (cricket patron), 18th-century English businessman and cricket patron
Richard "Beaver Dick" Leigh, English-American trapper, scout, and guide

See also
Richard Lee (disambiguation)